Begin Again is the second album by British electronic rock band KLOQ, released 8 October 2013. The album was released via Metropolis Records.

The album reached No. 1 in its 13th week in the European Alternative Charts and also reached No. 1 on the Rockadia new release chart in its first week.

Track listing

Personnel
Dean Goodwin – lead vocals (all tracks except "Jenny") 
Oz Morsley –  Synths and Programming 
Tim Jackson (Bass player) – bass 
Alex Baker – drums 
Roy 'Buster' Foster - guitars 
Jason Aldridge - guest vocals (Jenny and Crash)

References

2013 albums
KLOQ (band) albums